Althea Rae Duhinio Janairo (born January 2, 1967), known professionally as Tia Carrere, is an American actress, singer and former model who got her first big break as a regular on the daytime soap opera General Hospital.

Carrere played Cassandra Wong in the feature films Wayne's World and Wayne's World 2; Juno Skinner in True Lies; Nani Pelekai in the Lilo & Stitch films and TV series; Queen Tyr'ahnee in Duck Dodgers; Richard Lewis's girlfriend, Cha Cha, in Curb Your Enthusiasm; and starred as Sydney Fox in the television series Relic Hunter, as well as Lady Danger opposite RuPaul in Netflix's AJ and the Queen. Carrere also appeared as a contestant in the second season of Dancing with the Stars and the fifth season of The Celebrity Apprentice. In addition to acting, Carrere has won two Grammy Awards for her music.

Early life
Carrere was born in Honolulu, Hawaii. She is the daughter of Audrey Lee Janairo, a computer supervisor and Alexander Janairo, a banker. She is of Filipino and Chinese descent.

Carrere attended Sacred Hearts Academy, an all-girls school. She longed to be a singer as a child. Though she was eliminated during the first round of her 1985 Star Search appearance at the age of 18, she was spotted by a local producer while shopping at a Waikiki grocery store and was cast in the movie Aloha Summer. At around this time, she adopted her stage name by using her sister's nickname for her, "Tia" and using a variation of the last name "Carrera" in tribute to actress Barbara Carrera.

Film and television career
Following this success, Carrere returned to Los Angeles, and after working several months as a model, landed her first role in the American television series Airwolf in early 1985. Her first major breakthrough was in the daytime soap opera General Hospital. She played the role of Jade Soong Chung from 1985 to 1987. She also had a guest appearance on Tour of Duty and The A-Team, which was supposed to lead to her joining the cast; her General Hospital obligations, however, prevented her from joining the team. Her character was dropped after one episode, and was never mentioned again. She also made guest appearances on MacGyver as a karate instructor in the episode "The Wish Child" and later as an assassin in the episode "Murderer's Sky". She also appeared on Anything but Love as the adopted daughter of Marty Gold (Richard Lewis), and on an episode of Married... with Children as Piper Bauman, a modelling rival of Kelly Bundy.

After appearing in the 1991 action films Harley Davidson and the Marlboro Man and Showdown in Little Tokyo, she emerged into the public spotlight when cast as Cassandra, a rock singer and love interest of Mike Myers's character, Wayne Campbell, in Wayne's World (1992), a role she reprised the next year in Wayne's World 2. A trained singer, Carrere performed all of her own songs in the first film, and the Wayne's World soundtrack features her vocals. She turned down a role in Baywatch to audition for Wayne's World. In 1992, People named her to its annual "50 most beautiful people" list.

Other roles in prominent films include the parts of wealthy smuggler Juno Skinner in True Lies, a 1994 Arnold Schwarzenegger action film; a mixed African-Japanese computer expert in Rising Sun, a thriller co-written for the screen by Michael Crichton and based on his novel, starring Sean Connery and Wesley Snipes; robber Gina Walker in The Immortals in 1995; and secretary Victoria Chappell in High School High, a 1996 parody. She also starred as Ari, a space marine turned pirate, in the 1995 adventure/puzzle game The Daedalus Encounter. She also starred as the evil witch/queen in the 1997 Universal Films picture Kull the Conqueror, co-starring versus Kevin Sorbo, and starred in late-'90s M&M's commercials as herself. At the end of the decade, she was cast as Ana Ishikawa in the motion picture of the comic book character Shi, but the film wasn't concreted.

From 1999 to 2002, Carrere starred as archeology professor Sydney Fox in Relic Hunter, a syndicated action-adventure series strongly reminiscent of the Indiana Jones and Tomb Raider films and video games. At this time, Carrere was featured in the men's magazine Maxim. Relic Hunter lasted for a total of three contracted television seasons. Carrere then provided the voice of Lilo's sister Nani in the animated film Lilo & Stitch (2002) and its spinoffs, as well as the voice of Queen Tyr'ahnee from the 2003 Duck Dodgers animated series. She also provided the voice of Snookie in the 2005 animated film Aloha, Scooby-Doo!

She participated as a contestant on the popular reality show Dancing with the Stars, and eventually placed sixth overall. Carrere later participated in the fifth season of The Celebrity Apprentice, but her "apprenticeship" to Donald Trump, the "boss" of the show, was terminated in that season's fifth week.

Carrere posed nude for the January 2003 issue of Playboy. The photos were republished in the German December 2006 issue of the magazine. She has appeared as a guest star on a number of television shows, including Back to You, Nip/Tuck, and Warehouse 13. She has also appeared in several episodes of season six of Curb Your Enthusiasm as Richard Lewis's girlfriend. In 2020, Carrere played Lady Danger in all ten episodes of the Netflix series AJ and the Queen.

Music career

Carrere also maintains a singing career. In 1993, her first solo album, Dream, produced by Matt Prinz, was released and went platinum in the Philippines. That same year, she was featured on the soundtrack of Batman: Mask of the Phantasm, performing the ending theme, "I Never Even Told You". Carrere then focused on Hawaiian music starting with her second album, Hawaiiana, which was released in June 2007 and featured Grammy Award-winning record producer Daniel Ho accompanying her on slack-key guitar and ukulele. The album was nominated for a 2008 Grammy Award under the category Best Hawaiian Music Album.

In 2009, Carrere served as co-host for the pre-Grammy Awards telecast online event alongside Wayne Brady. She won a Grammy Award in 2009 for her third album Ikena, and her 2010 album He Nani was also nominated for a Grammy. In 2011, she won her second Grammy Award  for her album Huana Ke Aloha.

Personal life
Carrere married film producer Elie Samaha in 1992. Samaha and Carrere divorced in February 2000. On November 30, 2002, she married photojournalist Simon Wakelin. They have a daughter. On April 2, 2010, Carrere filed for divorce in person at Los Angeles County Superior Court. According to court documents she cited irreconcilable differences as the reason for the divorce and asked for sole physical custody of their daughter. Their divorce was finalized in August 2010, with the two of them reportedly sharing custody of their daughter. She lives in Los Angeles.

Filmography

Film

Television

Video games

Discography

Studio albums
 Dream (1993)
 Hawaiiana (2007)
  'Ikena (with Daniel Ho, 2008)
 He Nani (with Daniel Ho, 2009)
 Huana Ke Aloha (2010)

Soundtracks
Wayne's World: Music from the Motion Picture (1992)

Batman: Mask of the Phantasm The Animated Movie Original Motion Picture Soundtrack (1993)

Dancing with the Stars

Season 2 performances

Awards and nominations 
The following is a list of awards and nominations received by Carrere

Notes

References

External links

 
 
 
 
 
 

1967 births
Living people
Actresses from Honolulu
Actresses from Los Angeles
American actresses of Filipino descent
American women pop singers
American film actresses
American musicians of Chinese descent
American musicians of Filipino descent
American people of Spanish descent
American television actresses
American video game actresses
American voice actresses
Grammy Award winners
Hawaii people of Chinese descent
Hawaii people of Filipino descent
Hispanic and Latino American actresses
Hispanic and Latino American female models
Hispanic and Latino American women singers
Musicians from Honolulu
Participants in American reality television series
The Apprentice (franchise) contestants
20th-century American actresses
21st-century American actresses
20th-century American singers
21st-century American singers
20th-century American women singers
21st-century American women singers